Albert Mauer (12 February 1907 – 10 May 1999) was a Polish ice hockey player who competed in the 1932 Winter Olympics.

He was born in Peuerbach, Austria-Hungary and died in Bytom, Poland.

In 1932 he was a member of the Polish ice hockey team which finished fourth in the Olympic tournament. He played one match.

During World War II he was sent by Nazis to forced labour in Austria.

External links
  (archive)
 
 
 

1907 births
1999 deaths
Ice hockey players at the 1932 Winter Olympics
Olympic ice hockey players of Poland
People from Grieskirchen District